San Giuseppe is a late-Baroque-style, Roman Catholic church located on Via Garibaldi in the town of Santa Maria Nuova, region of Marche, Italy.

History 
The church was built in 1762. The interiors are elaborately decorated in stucco, and it contains an altarpiece attributed to the Aquilini.

References 

18th-century Roman Catholic church buildings in Italy
Roman Catholic churches completed in 1762
Baroque architecture in Marche
Churches in the Province of Ancona
Roman Catholic churches in the Marche